Medford is a city  northwest of downtown Boston on the Mystic River in Middlesex County, Massachusetts, United States. At the time of the 2020 U.S. Census, Medford's population was 59,659. It is home to Tufts University, which has its campus along the Medford and Somerville border.

History

Indigenous history 

Native Americans inhabited the area that would become Medford for thousands of years prior to European colonization of the Americas. At the time of European contact and exploration, Medford was the winter home of the Naumkeag people, who farmed corn and created fishing weirs at multiple sites along the Mystic River. Naumkeag sachem Nanepashemet was killed and buried at his fortification in present-day Medford during a war with the Tarrantines in 1619. The contact period introduced a number of European infectious diseases which would decimate native populations in virgin soil epidemics, including a smallpox epidemic which in 1633 which killed Nanepashemet's sons, sachems Montowompate and Wonohaquaham. Sagamore Park in West Medford is a native burial site from the contact period which includes the remains of a likely sachem, either Nanepashemet or Wonohaquaham. After the 1633 epidemic, Nanepashemet's widow, known only as the Squaw Sachem of Mistick, led the Naumkeag, and over the next two decades would deed large parts of Naumkeag territory to English settlers. In 1639, the Massachusetts General Court purchased the land that would become present day Medford, then within the boundaries of Charlestown, from the Squaw Sachem.

17th century
Medford was settled in 1630 by English colonists as part of Charlestown, of the Massachusetts Bay Colony. The settlement was originally called "Mistick" by Thomas Dudley, based on the indigenous name for the area's river. Thomas Dudley's  party renamed the settlement "Meadford". The name may have come from a description of the "meadow by the ford" in the Mystic River, or from two locations in England that Cradock may have known: the hamlet of Mayford or Metford in Staffordshire near Caverswall, or from the parish of Maidford or Medford (now Towcester, Northamptonshire). In 1634, the land north of the Mystic River was developed as the private plantation of Matthew Cradock, a former governor. Across the river was Ten Hills Farm, which belonged to John Winthrop, Governor of the Massachusetts Bay colony.

In 1637, the first bridge (a toll bridge) across the Mystic River was built at the site of the present-day Cradock Bridge, which carries Main Street into Medford Square. It would be the only bridge across the Mystic until 1787, and as such became a major route for traffic coming into Boston from the north (though ferries and fords were also used). The bridge would be rebuilt in 1880, 1909, and 2018.

Until 1656, all of northern Medford was owned by Cradock, his heirs, or Edward Collins. Medford was governed as a "peculiar" or private plantation. As the land began to be divided among several people from different families, the new owners began to meet and make decisions locally and increasingly independently from the Charlestown town meeting. In 1674, a Board of Selectmen was elected; in 1684, the colonial legislature granted the ability to raise money independently; and in 1689, a representative to the legislature was chosen. The town got its own religious meeting room in 1690, and a secular meeting house in 1696.

In 1692, the town engaged its first ordained preacher, Rev. John Hancock Sr. During his time of service Rev. Hancock lived in Medford, serving until November 1693. One of his grandsons was John Hancock, who was a later notable figure of the American Revolutionary War and later elected as first and third governor of Massachusetts.

18th and 19th centuries
The land south of the Mystic River, present-day South Medford, was originally known as "Mistick Field". It was transferred from Charlestown to Medford in 1754. This grant also included the "Charlestown woodlots" (the Medford part of the Middlesex Fells), and part of what was at the time Woburn (now Winchester). Other parts of Medford were transferred from Charlestown in 1811, Winchester in 1850 ("Upper Medford"), and Malden in 1879. Additional land was transferred to Medford from Malden (1817), Everett (1875), and Malden (1877) again.

The population of Medford went from 230 in 1700 to 1,114 in 1800. After 1880, the population rapidly expanded, reaching 18,244 by 1900. Farmland was divided into lots and sold to build residential and commercial buildings, starting in the 1840s and 1850s; government services expanded with the population (schools, police, post office) and technological advancement (gas lighting, electricity, telephones, railways). Tufts University was chartered in 1852 and the Crane Theological School at Tufts opened in 1869. In 1865 the Lawrence Rifles volunteer militia company was formed in Medford during the Civil War.

Medford was incorporated as a city in 1892, and was a center of industry, including the manufacture of tiles and crackers, bricks, rum, and clipper ships, such as the White Swallow and the Kingfisher, both built by Hayden & Cudworth.

Transportation
During the 17th century, a handful of major public roads (High Street, Main Street, Salem Street, "the road to Stoneham", and South Street) served the population, but the road network started a long-term expansion in the 18th century. The Medford Turnpike Company was incorporated in 1803, and (as was reasonably common at the time) turned what is now Mystic Avenue over to the city in 1866. The Andover Turnpike Company was incorporated in 1805, and turned what is now Forest Street and Fellsway West over to Medford in 1830.

Other major commercial transportation projects included the Middlesex Canal by 1803, the Boston and Lowell Railroad in West Medford in the 1830s, and the Boston and Maine Railroad to Medford Center in 1847.

A horse-powered street railway began running to Somerville and Charlestown in 1860. The street railway network expanded in the hands of various private companies, and went electric in the late 1890s, when trolleys to Everett and downtown Boston were available. Streetcars were converted to buses in the 20th century. Interstate 93 was constructed between 1956 and 1963.

Spongy moth
In 1868, a French astronomer and naturalist, Leopold Trouvelot, was attempting to breed a better silkworm using spongy moths. Several of the moths escaped from his home, at 27 Myrtle Street. Within ten years, the insect had denuded the vegetation in the neighborhood. It spread over North America.

Holiday songs
In Simpson's Tavern, a tavern and boarding house on High Street, in the late 19th century, local resident James Pierpont is rumored to have written "Jingle Bells" after watching a sleigh race from Medford to Malden. There is also a claim that Pierpont wrote it while he was the music director at Unitarian Universalist Church in Savannah, Georgia. He copyrighted the song while there.

Another local resident, Lydia Maria Child (1802–1880), made a poem out of the trip across town to her grandparents' house, now the song "Over the River and Through the Wood".

Other notables

Paul Revere's famous midnight ride traveled along Main Street, continuing onto High Street in Medford Square. An annual re-enactment takes place honoring the historic event.

The Peter Tufts House (350 Riverside Ave.) is thought to be the oldest all-brick building in New England. Another important site is the "Slave Wall" on Grove Street, built by "Pomp," a slave owned by the prominent Brooks family. The Isaac Royall House, which once belonged to one of Harvard Law School's founders, Isaac Royall, Jr., is a National Historic Landmark and a local history museum. The house was used by Continental Army troops, including George Washington and John Stark, during the American Revolutionary War.

George Luther Stearns, an American industrialist and one of John Brown's Secret Six. His passion for the abolitionist cause shaped his life, bringing him into contact with the likes of Abraham Lincoln and Ralph Waldo Emerson and starting The Nation magazine. He was given the rank of major by Massachusetts Governor John Andrew and spent most of the Civil War recruiting for the 54th and 55th Massachusetts regiments and the 5th cavalry.

Medford was home to Fannie Farmer, author of one of the world's most famous cookbooks—as well as James Plimpton, the man credited with the 1863 invention of the first practical four-wheeled roller skate, which set off a roller craze that quickly spread across the United States and Europe.

Amelia Earhart lived in Medford while working as a social worker in 1925.

Elizabeth Short, the victim of an infamous Hollywood murder and who became known as The Black Dahlia, was born in Hyde Park (the southernmost neighborhood of the city of Boston, Massachusetts) but raised in Medford before going to the West Coast looking for fame.

Medford has sent more than its share of athletes to the National Hockey League; Shawn Bates, though born in Melrose, MA grew up in Medford, as did Keith Tkachuk, Mike Morrison, David Sacco, and Joe Sacco. Former Red Sox pitcher Bill Monbouquette grew up in Medford, as did former Major League Baseball infielder Mike Pagliarulo.

Medford was home to Michael Bloomberg, American businessman, philanthropist, and the founder of Bloomberg L.P. He was the Mayor of New York City from 2002 to 2013. Mayor Bloomberg attended Medford High School and resided in Medford until after he graduated from college at Johns Hopkins University. His mother remained a resident of Medford until her death in 2011.

The only cryobank of amniotic stem cells in the United States is located in Medford, built by Biocell Center, a biotechnology company led by Giuseppe Simoni.

Medford and the law
Medford was the location of some famous crimes:
 One of the biggest bank robberies and jewel heists in world history  happened on Memorial Day weekend in 1980, when several crooked officers of the Medford Police and Metropolitan District Commission Police forces robbed the Depositors Trust Bank in Medford Square, yielding an estimated $25 million. The book The Cops Are Robbers: A Convicted Cop's True Story of Police Corruption is based upon this event. Salvatore's Restaurant, located at 55 High Street in Medford Square, is partially in the same location as the bank that was robbed. The private dining room in the restaurant uses the bank's vault door as an entrance way, and the hole in the corner of the ceiling that the robbers crawled through was left intact for nostalgia.
 An admitted Mob execution by Somerville's Winter Hill Gang of Joe "Indian-Joe" Notarangeli took place at the "Pewter Pot" café in Medford Square, now called the "Lighthouse Cafe."
 In October 1989, the FBI recorded a Mafia initiation ceremony held by the Patriarca crime family at a home on Guild St. in Medford.

Geography
Medford is located at  (42.419996, −71.107942).

A park called the Middlesex Fells Reservation, to the north, is partly within the city. This  preserve is shared by Medford with the municipalities of Winchester, Stoneham, Melrose, and Malden. The Mystic River flows roughly west to southeast through the middle of the city.

Neighborhoods
People from Medford often identify themselves with a particular neighborhood.
 West Medford
 Brooks Estates
 Fulton Heights/The Heights (North Medford)
 Wellington (East Medford)
 Glenwood
 Lawrence Estates
 South Medford
 Medford Hillside
 Tufts University (mostly contiguous, situated on Medford Hillside)

Demographics

Irish-Americans are a strong presence in the city and live in all areas. South Medford is a traditionally Italian neighborhood. West Medford, the most affluent of Medford's many neighborhoods, was once the bastion of some of Boston's elite families—including Peter Chardon Brooks, one of the wealthiest men in post-colonial America, and father-in-law to Charles Francis Adams—and is also home to an historic African-American neighborhood that dates to the Civil War.

As of the census of 2010, there were 56,173 people, 22,810 households, and 13,207 families residing in the city. The racial makeup of the city was 78.6% White, 8.80% African American, 0.2% Native American, 6.9% Asian, 0.01% Pacific Islander, 2.8% from other races, and 2.7% from two or more races. Hispanic or Latino of any race were 4.4% of the population.

There were 22,810 households, out of which 22.3% had children under the age of 18 living with them, 42.5% were married couples living together, 11.4% had a female householder with no husband present, and 42.1% were non-families. 24.6% of all households were made up of individuals, and 11.1% had someone living alone who was 65 years of age or older. The average household size was 2.38 and the average family size was 3.00.

In the city, the population was spread out, with 13.8% under the age of 15, 14.3% from 15 to 24, 31.7% from 25 to 44, 24.9% from 45 to 64, and 15.2% who were 65 years of age or older. The median age was 37.7 years. For every 100 females, there were 91.5 males. For every 100 females age 18 and over, there were 89.4 males.

The median income for a household in the city was $52,476, and the median income for a family was $62,409. Males had a median income of $41,704 versus $34,948 for females. The per capita income for the city was $24,707. About 4.1% of families and 6.4% of the population were below the poverty line, including 5.7% of those under age 18 and 7.4% of those age 65 or over.

Medford has three Public, educational, and government access (PEG) cable TV channels. The Public-access television channel is TV3, The Educational-access television is channel 15 and 16 is the Government-access television (GATV) municipal channel.

Education

Medford is home to many schools, public and private.

Elementary
Public

 Missituk Elementary School
 Brooks Elementary School
 John J. McGlynn Elementary School
 Milton Fuller Roberts Elementary School
Private (non-sectarian)
 Eliot-Pearson Children's School (Pre-K–2)
 Gentle-Dragon Preschool (Pre-K)
 Merry-Go-Round Nursery School (Pre-K)
 Play Academy Learning Center (Pre-K–K)
 Oakland Park Children's Center (Pre-K)
 Six Acres Nursery School (Pre-K–K) (non-sectarian, but run through Medford Jewish Community Center)
Private (sectarian)
 St. Joseph's (K–8)
 St. Raphael's (Pre-K–8)

Middle School

 John J. McGlynn Middle School
 Madeline Dugger Andrews Middle School

High School
Public

 Medford High School
 Medford Vocational Technical High School
 Mascot: Mustang

College
Private
 Tufts University

Miscellaneous education
Private
 The , a supplementary school for Japanese people, holds classes at Medford High. Its weekday offices are in Arlington

Government

Local government
 Breanna Lungo-Koehn, Mayor
 Adam L. Hurtubise, City Clerk
 Nina Nazarian, Chief of Staff

City Council

 Nicole Morell, President
 Isaac B. "Zac" Bears, Vice President
 Richard F. Caraviello
 Kit Collins
 Adam Knight
 George A. Scarpelli
 Justin Tseng
 

School Committee

 Breanna Lungo-Koehn, Chair
 Jenny R. Graham, Vice Chair
 Sharon Hays
 Kathy Kreatz
 Melanie P. McLaughlin
 Mea Quinn Mustone
 Paul Ruseau, Secretary

Local media and news

The City of Medford has several local news and media outlets:

Print

 Medford Transcript
 Medford Daily Mercury – 1880–2017

Transportation
Medford is served by MBTA bus local routes 80, 94, 95, 96, 99, 100, 101, 108, 134, and 710, plus express routes 325 and 326.

Interstate 93 travels roughly north–south through the city. State routes passing through Medford include 16, 28, 38, and 60.

Points of interest

 Tufts University: Though the Tufts campus is mainly located in Medford, the Somerville–Medford border actually runs through it. The school employs many local residents and has many community service projects that serve the city, especially those run through the Leonard Carmichael Society and the Jonathan M. Tisch College of Citizenship and Public Service, the latter of which especially emphasizes public service in Tufts' host communities.
 Isaac Royall House, the only surviving slave quarters in Massachusetts, a 1692 house operating as a non-profit museum.
 The Unitarian Universalist Church of Medford: Medford's first religious community since 1690.
 Amelia Earhart residence, 76 Brooks Street
 John Wade House, built 1784, added to the National Register of Historic Places in 1975
 Former site of Fannie Farmer's house, corner of Paris & Salem Streets
 Grandfather's House
 Grace Church, designed by H. H. Richardson
 Gravity Research Foundation monument at Tufts University
 Henry Bradlee Jr. House
 Jingle Bells historical marker, High Street
 Salem Street Burying Ground
 Old Ship Street Historic District: Area around Riverside Ave (formerly Ship Street) containing many historic homes
 United States Post Office–Medford Main, historic 1937 building

Notable people

 Edwin Adams (1834–1877), stage comedian of the 19th century
 Lou Antonelli, science fiction writer
 Rev. Hosea Ballou II, Minister of 1st Universalist and first president of Tufts College
 Shawn Bates, professional hockey player, New York Islanders
 Bia, rapper, singer, and model
 Jessica Biel, actress, resident while attending Tufts University
 Heber R. Bishop (1840–1902), industrialist and financier
 Michael Bloomberg, mayor of New York City (2002–2013)
 Dale Bozzio, lead singer of Missing Persons
 Foghorn Bradley, was a baseball player and  umpire in Major League Baseball
 Hall L. Brooks, former member of the Wisconsin State Assembly
 Loren Bouchard, animator, musician, filmmaker, creator and showrunner of Bob's Burgers
 Mary Carew, Olympic gold medalist sprinter, born in Medford
 Terri Lyne Carrington, jazz drummer
 John Ciardi, poet and translator of Dante
 Lydia Maria Child, anti-slavery activist, writer of the poem "Over the River and Through the Woods"
 Martha Coakley, former attorney general of Massachusetts
 Joe Coleman, Major League Baseball player
 James O. Curtis (1804–1890), Medford shipbuilder who built ships powered by sail or by screw and steam
 Thayer David, TV and film character actor
 Edward Dugger (1894–1939), African American military commander
 Amelia Earhart, pioneer aviator, born in Kansas, lived in Medford as a young woman
 Eugene Fama, Nobel Memorial Prize in Economic Sciences
 Fannie Farmer, culinary expert
 Frank Fontaine, comedian and singer
 Paul Geary, former drummer of hard rock band Extreme, music manager for acts such as Godsmack
 Alan L. Gropman, military officer, college professor, and author
 Colonel Edward Needles Hallowell, merchant and commander of 54th Massachusetts Volunteer Infantry in the American Civil War
 John Hancock Sr., first ordained preacher of Medford, lived and served in Medford 1692–1693, grandfather to John Hancock, Governor of Massachusetts and famous revolutionary figure
 Robert Kelly, comedian known for Tourgasm
 Kathleen McCartney, president of Smith College, former dean of Harvard Graduate School of Education
 Michael McDowell, screenwriter of Beetlejuice and The Nightmare Before Christmas and author of Southern Gothic novels
 Dave McGillivray, race director of Boston Marathon
 Laurel McGoff, actress and singer
 Maria Menounos, Miss Massachusetts Teen USA 1996, media personality (Entertainment Tonight, Access Hollywood and Extra), actress, professional wrestler, hostess of the Eurovision Song Contest 2006
 Bill Monbouquette, Major League Baseball pitcher 1958–1968 (Red Sox, Tigers, Yankees)
 Priscilla Morrill, actress, played Edie Grant on the Mary Tyler Moore Show
 John Forbes Nash, Princeton professor, winner of Nobel Prize in Economics
 Julianne Nicholson, actress (Ally McBeal, Law and Order: Criminal Intent, August: Osage County)
 Alexis Ohanian, founder of reddit
 Mike Pagliarulo, Major League Baseball player (Yankees, Twins, Padres, Rangers, Orioles)
 Sam Petrucci, Graphic Designer, Original GI Joe artist. 
 James Pierpont, writer of "Jingle Bells"
 Rev. John Pierpont
 Charles H. Pizzano noted sculptor
 Ruth Posselt, classical violinist
 Robert D. Richardson, historian, grew up in the Osgood House
 William Zebina Ripley, economist and racial theorist
 Mark Roopenian, NFL player
 Isaac Royall, Jr., 18th century benefactor of Harvard
 David Sacco, NHL player
 Joe Sacco, NHL player and coach
 Claude Shannon, scientist, father of Information Theory and modern digital communications
 Elizabeth Short, aspiring actress, mutilated and murdered, dubbed the "Black Dahlia" by the press
 Clifford Shull, Nobel Prize–winning American physicist
 David Silva, Provost and Academic Vice President at Salem State University, linguistics scholar, essayist.
 Rev. Clarence Skinner, Dean of Religion at Tufts University, minister Hillside Universalist Church (1917–1920), theologian and pacifist
 Bill Staines, folk musician
 George Luther Stearns, industrialist, one of John Brown's Secret Six, lead recruiter of 54th and 55th Regiments
 Mark T. Sullivan, author who has written novels on his own and has co-authored three James Patterson novels
 Alexander Theroux, poet and author of Darconville's Cat
 Paul Theroux, author
 Keith Tkachuk, NHL player
 Ed Tryon, halfback at Colgate University, elected to College Football Hall of Fame in 1963
 Bob Tufts (1955–2019), Major League Baseball pitcher

See also

 Blessing of the Bay
 List of Fletcher (Tufts University) alumni
 List of Registered Historic Places in Medford, Massachusetts

References

Further reading
 Medford on the Mystic by Carl and Alan Seaburg, published by Medford Historical Society, is the source of much of the article.
 1871 Atlas of Massachusetts by Wall & Gray. Map of Massachusetts. Map of Middlesex County.
 1880 Map of Medford, Bird's Eye View by C.H Brainard.
 History of the Town of Medford, Middlesex County, Massachusetts by Charles Brooks, published 1855, 576 pages
  History of Middlesex County, Volume II, p. 158 etc. (Medford, by W. H. Whitmore). 1880, published by Estes and Lauriat; edited by Samual Adams Drake
 Alan Seaburg (2013). The First Universalist Church of Medford, Massachusetts. Billerica: Anne Miniver Press/

External links

 
 City Hall's website
 Medford Historical Society

 
1630 establishments in Massachusetts
Cities in Massachusetts
Cities in Middlesex County, Massachusetts
Populated places established in 1630